The Giddings Ministry was a Cabinet of Tasmania, and was formed on 24 January 2011. Until 17 January 2014, the Cabinet contained two members of the Tasmanian Greens (highlighted in green) the remainder being from the Labor Party (highlighted in grey). On 31 March 2014, the ministry was succeeded by the Hodgman Ministry after the Labor Party's defeat at the 2014 state election

First Giddings Ministry

Second Giddings Ministry
The first reshuffle of the Cabinet took place on 13 May 2011, prompted by the resignation from Cabinet of the former Premier David Bartlett, and the defeat of Lin Thorp in the Legislative Council election.

Third Giddings Ministry
On 16 January 2014, Premier Lara Giddings announced that the power sharing arrangement with the Tasmanian Greens was over, and that ministers Nick McKim and Cassy O'Connor would be replaced by Labor MPs, effective 17 January. She said that the ALP would not govern with Greens in the cabinet in future.

References

External links
The Ministry, Parliament of Tasmania

Tasmanian ministries
Australian Labor Party ministries in Tasmania